Ela Peroci (11 February 1922 – 18 November 2001) was a Slovene children's writer, author of numerous children's stories that are considered classics in Slovene children's literature. Her best known story is Muca Copatarica (Slipper Keeper Kitty), illustrated by Ančka Gošnik Godec, which has seen numerous reprints and has sold over 140,000 copies.

Peroci was born in Sveti Križ pri Rogaški Slatini in 1922. She trained as a teacher and started teaching in 1945. In 1948, she started working as a journalist for children's publications such as Pionir, Ciciban and Mladi Svet. She graduated from the University of Ljubljana in 1954 and then worked at the national radio broadcaster until her retirement in 1978. She wrote short stories for children but also published two poetry collections for adults. She died in Ljubljana in 2001.

She won the Levstik Award twice, in 1955 for Moj dežnik je lahko balon (My Umbrella Can Turn into a Balloon) and in 1956 for Tisočkratlepa (Thousandbeauty). In 1971 she won the Prešeren Foundation Award for her collection of stories Na oni strani srebrne črte (Beyond the Silver Line).

Bibliography

Picture Books
 Moj dežnik je lahko balon (My Umbrella Can Turn into a Balloon), 1955
 Tisočkratlepa (Thousandbeauty), 1956 
 Majhno kot mezinec (Small As the Thumb), 1957
 Muca Copatarica (Slipper Keeper Kitty), 1957
 Kje so stezice? (Where Are the Paths?), 1960
 Zato, ker je na nebu oblak (Because There is A Cloud in the Sky), 1963
 Hišica iz kock (House of Blocks), 1964
 Kozliček Goliček (Goliček the Goat), 1964
 Bomo šli s sanmi po snegu in spustili se po bregu (We Shall Take Our Sleigh and Sledge Down the Hill), 1965
 Vozimo, vozimo vlak (We Drive, We Drive A Train), 1965
 Čebelice (Bees), 1966
 Klobuček, petelin in roža (The Little Hat, the Cockrel and the Flower), 1968
 Pravljice žive v velikem starem mestu (Live Stories in the Big Old Town), 1969
 Stara hiša št. 3 (The Old House At No.3.), 1973
 Lalala (Lalala), 1975
 Modri zajec (The Blue Rabbit), 1975
 Nina v čudežni deželi (Nina In The Strange Land), 1985
 Telefon (The Telephone), 1987
 Amalija in Amalija (Amalia and Amalia), 1998

Stories
 Tacek (Tacek), 1959 
 Za lahko noč (Good Night Stories), 1964
 Očala tete Bajavaje (Aunt Bajvaja's Glasses), 1969
 Stolp iz voščilnic (The Greeting Card Tower), 1977
 Siva miš, ti loviš (Grey Mouse, You Catch), 1983
 Mož z dežnikom (The Man With the Umbrella), 1989
 Prisedite k moji mizici (Come And Sit At My Table), 1990
 Povestice Tik-Tak (Tick-tack Tales), 1998

Poetry
 Rišem dan (I Draw the Day), 1966
 Ko živim (When I Live), 1975

Prose
 Breskve (Peaches), 1959
 Po šoli me počakaj (Wait For Me After School), 1966
 Reci sonce, reci luna (Say Sun, Say Moon), 1979
 Fantek in punčka (Boy and Girl), 1996

References

Slovenian children's writers
Slovenian women children's writers
1922 births
2001 deaths
Levstik Award laureates
University of Ljubljana alumni
Yugoslav writers